John Thomas Graham (2 March 1878 – 22 January 1907) was an Australian rules footballer who played with Melbourne in the Victorian Football League (VFL).

Notes

External links 

1878 births
1907 deaths
Australian rules footballers from Victoria (Australia)
Melbourne Football Club players